Government Madhav Science College, Ujjain, also known by the shorter names as Madhav Science College, Ujjain or Madhav Science College, is a government college located in Ujjain, Madhya Pradesh, India. It is recognized by the University Grants Commission (UGC) and affiliated to Vikram University. it is accredited A++ grade by the National Assessment and Accreditation Council(NAAC)

References

External links
 

Science colleges in India
Universities and colleges in Madhya Pradesh
Education in Ujjain
Educational institutions established in 1890
1890 establishments in India